Xanomeline (LY-246,708; Lumeron, Memcor) is a small molecule muscarinic acetylcholine receptor agonist that was first synthesized in a collaboration between Eli Lilly and Novo Nordisk as an investigational therapeutic being studied for the treatment of central nervous system disorders.

Its pharmacological action is mediated primarily through stimulation of central nervous system muscarinic M1 and M4 receptor subtypes. Xanomeline is currently being developed as a combination drug (Kar-XT; xanomeline + trospium) by Karuna Therapeutics. Trospium is a non-CNS penetrant non-selective muscarinic antagonist to quell peripheral muscarinic agonist-dependent side effects. Xanomeline’s mechanism of action is hypothesized to be via rebalancing key neurotransmitter circuits, including acetylcholine, dopamine, and glutamate, which are disrupted in schizophrenia and related diseases.

Chemistry 

Xanomeline has structural and pharmacological similarities to the main psychoactive ingredient in betel (areca) nut, arecoline, and the natural muscarinic receptor neurotransmitter, acetylcholine. Xanomeline is an achiral and lipophilic small molecule with a molecular weight of 281.4 (also known as hexyloxy-TZTP, LY246708, Lumeron, Memcor - Eli Lilly; NNC 11-0232 - Novo Nordisk; Kar-XT, Karuna Therapeutics). Xanomeline’s physical chemical properties, including low molecular weight, lipophilicity, and absence of hydrogen bond donors, favor its entry into the brain with a high brain to plasma ratio (> 10:1).

Pharmacology 

Xanomeline is an agonist that primarily targets the muscarinic acetylcholine receptor family of five muscarinic receptor subtypes, which are designated M1-M5. While it binds with near identical affinity to all five of the muscarinic receptor subtypes as measured by displacement of a muscarinic radioligand, the preponderance of evidence suggests that xanomeline acts preferentially in the central nervous system as a functionally selective partial agonist at the M1 and M4 muscarinic receptors. It has more modest partial agonist pharmacology at the M2, M3 and M5 receptors.

Central nervous system 

Xanomeline regulates key dopaminergic and glutamatergic circuits in the brain that are thought to be imbalanced in patients suffering from neuropsychiatric and neurological diseases such as schizophrenia and Alzheimer’s disease through stimulation primarily of central M1 and M4 muscarinic receptor subtypes. Muscarinic M1 and M4 receptors have been shown in preclinical studies to be expressed in areas important for dopamine and glutamate neural circuit regulation (e.g. frontal cortex and dorsal and ventral striatum,). Xanomeline has shown antipsychotic-like activity in various preclinical behavioral models  which is dependent on M1 and M4 receptor activation.

Clinical development 

Xanomeline was first discovered in a therapeutic development collaboration between Eli Lilly & Co. and Novo Nordisk pharmaceutical companies in the early 1990’s. Eli Lilly led the first clinical development effort of xanomeline through a phase 2 clinical trial to test the hypothesis that it would improve cognition in patients suffering from cognitive decline observed in Alzheimer’s disease  and later in a small placebo-controlled study in schizophrenia. Xanomeline’s development was discontinued primarily due to cholinergic side effects observed in clinical studies. Further development was enabled through a novel co-formulation strategy with the peripherally restricted muscarinic antagonist, trospium, to quell the peripheral cholinergic side effects. This new dual drug formulation is currently called KarXT.

See also 
 Alvameline
 Milameline
 Sabcomeline
 Tazomeline
 Vedaclidine

References

Further reading 
 
 
 

Muscarinic agonists
Tetrahydropyridines
Thiadiazoles